Asgaard Das Göttliche ('Asgard the Divine') is a beer produced and marketed by the AsGaard Brauerei Schleswig in Germany. The beer is connected to Viking culture in its marketing and name, which is reference to Asgaard of Norse mythology, a realm of the gods of the Vikings, the Aesir, known for their heavy beer consumption. These clans made settlement in Haitabu, which was one of the biggest trade cities in Northern Europe, and is near the modern German town of Schleswig, where brewmaster Ronald T. Carius opened the Asgaard brewery and pub in 1994.

References

Beer brands of Germany